Novy Burtyuk (Yañı Börtök) is a rural locality (a village) in Novoburinsky Selsoviet, Krasnokamsky District, Bashkortostan, Russia. The population was 527 as of 2010. There are 9 streets.

Geography 
Novy Burtyuk is located 60 km southeast of Nikolo-Beryozovka (the district's administrative centre) by road. Stary Burtyuk is the nearest rural locality.

References 

Rural localities in Krasnokamsky District